The Duddlestone Baronetcy, of Bristol in the County of Gloucester, was a title in the Baronetage of England. It was created on 11 January 1692 for Sir John Duddlestone, a Bristol merchant.

Duddlestone baronets, of Bristol (1692)
Sir John Duddlestone, 1st Baronet (died )
Sir John Duddlestone, 2nd Baronet (died c. 1750)

References

Extinct baronetcies in the Baronetage of England